David Cameron Lougheed (born April 11, 1968) is a Canadian former rugby union footballer, playing at wing and centre. He was considered large for a winger, being 1.88m tall and weighing 91 kg though his quick feet and amazing hands made up any imbalances.

Born in Toronto, Ontario, Lougheed was educated at Queen's University, Canada, starting his career playing at Toronto Welsh and then Balmy Beach.

In 1990, Lougheed made his debut for Canada against Argentina and went on to gain 34 caps. Despite retiring from the international game after the 1999 World Cup, he returned to play in the 2003 World Cup.

In 1998, Lougheed signed for Leicester Tigers, playing his debut against Harlequins. In 2000 he announced his retirement, however shortly afterwards signed a one-week contract with injury stricken Gloucester.

Lougheed now lives in Calgary, Alberta and coaches the 2006 Western Canadian University Rugby Champions, the University of Calgary Dinos Rugby team.

External links
 
 Leicester Tigers
 Lougheed answers Gloucester SOS

1968 births
Living people
Canada international rugby union players
Canadian rugby union players
Canadian expatriate sportspeople in England
Gloucester Rugby players
Leicester Tigers players
Sportspeople from Toronto
Rugby union centres
Rugby union wings